The 1982 Nedlands state by-election was a by-election held on 13 March 1982 for the Western Australian Legislative Assembly seat of Nedlands in the western suburbs of Perth.

The by-election was triggered by the resignation of the Liberal member for the seat, Premier Sir Charles Court, on 25 January 1982. Court had held the seat since the 1953 state election. Having served as a senior minister in the Brand–Watts Ministry and then as Premier since the 1974 state election, his retirement had been widely expected and was announced on 18 December, a few months after his 70th birthday. He claimed that he had delayed his retirement to carry through the battle against the federal government over funding for Western Australia.

On 2 February 1982, the Speaker of the Western Australian Legislative Assembly issued a writ for an election in the district. It was to be held concurrently with a by-election in the Labor-held seat of Swan and a legislative council by-election for South Metropolitan. His son, 33-year-old businessman Richard Court, was preselected for the Liberal Party to run for the seat.

The seat of Nedlands, first established in 1929, was considered to be a safe seat for the Liberal Party, and had had just two other members since its creation—former Attorney-General and leader of the Nationalist Party, Norbert Keenan, and the independent Liberal member David Grayden, who served for a single term from 1950 until his defeat in 1953 by Court.

Timeline

Candidates 
The by-election attracted six candidates. Local businesswoman and long-standing Liberal Party member Margaret Sheen nominated as an Independent Liberal, while the Labor Party nominated lawyer Ian Temby QC, who had been prominent in assisting the Labor Party with court challenges to the government's electoral legislation. Temby accused local real estate agents of discriminating against him with a view to preventing him from obtaining a campaign office. The Australian Democrats, perennial independent candidate Alf Bussell and another independent who had also stood at the 1977 and 1980 elections also nominated.

Results
As largely predicted, Richard Court retained the seat for the Liberal Party, albeit against an estimated swing of 9.1% to the ALP.

References 

1982 elections in Australia
Western Australian state by-elections
1980s in Perth, Western Australia